Marko Ivović (born 22 December 1990) is a Serbian professional volleyball player. He is part of the Serbian national volleyball team. The 2019 European Champion and the 2016 World League winner. At the professional club level, he plays for Dynamo LO.

Career

Clubs
Ivović spent the 2013–14 season playing for Paris Volley. His team won the CEV Cup and he himself was named the Most Valuable Player of the final.

In 2014, he moved to the PlusLiga team, Asseco Resovia. He won the 2014–15 CEV Champions League silver medal, having lost to Zenit Kazan in the final, and the 2015 Polish Champion title. In May 2015, he left Resovia and signed a contract with the Russian team, Belogorie Belgorod. In April 2016, he came back to Asseco Resovia for the 2016–17 season.

In April 2018, Lokomotiv Novosibirsk, announced that they had signed Ivović for the 2018–19 season.

National team
In 2015, Serbia reached the World League final, but eventually lost to France (0–3), and obtained silver medals.

On 17 July 2016, the Serbian national volleyball team won their first ever World League title by a 3–0 win over Brazil. Marko Ivović earned the tournament's Most Valuable Player award.

Marko Ivović was voted the Best Volleyball Player in Serbia in 2016.

Honours

Clubs
 CEV Champions League
  2014/2015 – with Asseco Resovia

 CEV Cup
  2013/2014 – with Paris Volley

 National championships
 2009/2010  Serbian Cup, with Vojvodina Novi Sad
 2011/2012  Serbian Cup, with Vojvodina Novi Sad
 2013/2014  French SuperCup, with Paris Volley
 2013/2014  French Championship, with Paris Volley
 2014/2015  Polish Championship, with Asseco Resovia
 2019/2020  Russian Championship, with Lokomotiv Novosibirsk

Individual awards
 2014: French Championship – Most Valuable Player
 2014: French Championship – Best Receiver
 2014: CEV Cup – Most Valuable Player
 2016: FIVB World League – Best Outside Spiker 
 2016: FIVB World League – Most Valuable Player
 2016: Best Volleyball Player in Serbia

References

External links

 
 Player profile at PlusLiga.pl 
 Player profile at Volleybox.net

1990 births
Living people
People from Ljig
Serbian men's volleyball players
European champions for Serbia
Serbian expatriate sportspeople in Turkey
Expatriate volleyball players in Turkey
Serbian expatriate sportspeople in France
Expatriate volleyball players in France
Serbian expatriate sportspeople in Poland
Expatriate volleyball players in Poland
Serbian expatriate sportspeople in Russia
Expatriate volleyball players in Russia
Serbian expatriate sportspeople in Brazil
Expatriate volleyball players in Brazil
Paris Volley players
Resovia (volleyball) players
Outside hitters